HK Mogilev is an ice hockey team in Mogilev, Belarus. The team competes in the Belarusian Extraliga (BXL).

History
HK Mogilev was formed in 2000 and joined the Belarusian Extraleague in for the 2000–01 season. The following season the club changed their name to Khimvolokno Mogilev which they played under from 2001 until 2010. In 2001 Mogilev joined the Eastern European Hockey League Division B league as well as playing in the Belarusian Extraleague. For the 2002–03 season, Mogilev was promoted to the Eastern European Hockey League (EEHL) top league and did not compete in the Extraleague for the season. The club returned to the Extraleague for the 2003–04 season and competed in the final EEHL season before the league folded. Mogilev continued to compete in the Belarusian Extraleague until the end of the 2012–13 season. 

In July 2013, it was announced that the club had declared bankruptcy and would cease to exist. The club also announced that HK Mogilev-2 would continue to compete in the Vysshaya Liga. Later in July, Vladimir Podrebinkin – head of the Mogilev Regional Hockey Federation – announced that the club would continue playing in the Belarusian Extraleague for the 2013–14 season.

Current roster

References

External links
Official website

Ice hockey teams in Belarus
Eastern European Hockey League teams
Belarusian Extraleague teams